The South Seas Communist Party (SSCP), also known as the Nanyang Communist Party, was a communist party in Southeast Asia established in 1925 when the Chinese Communist Party dissolved its overseas branches in Nanyang to make way for the creation of local communist parties. The SSCP succeeded earlier efforts by the Indonesian communist Tan Malaka to establish communist parties in the region.

The SSCP was headquartered in Singapore. The SSCP disbanded in 1930, and national communist parties were formed, such as the Communist Party of Indochina (led by Ho Chi Minh), Malayan Communist Party and Communist Party of Siam.

South Seas Communist Party in Burma
A minor branch of the South Seas Communist Party was formed in Burma. The group was formed by Wu Wei Sai (alias Wu Ching Sin), who had arrived to Rangoon in May 1929. Along with his wife he conducted propaganda activities in the Rangoon Chinatown. A small group of followers was formed, but largely the establishment of a Chinese communist movement in Burma failed as the Chinese community in Burma was dominated by middle-class elements. Rangoon had relatively few Chinese labourers. Wu Wei Sai left Burma in 1930. The group that remained, the Provisional Committee, Special Division, Burma of the South Seas Communist Party, had only a handful members. Some were deported to China by the British authorities.

References

Communism in Thailand
Communism in Singapore
Communist parties in Malaysia
Communist parties in Myanmar
Communist parties in Vietnam
Defunct political parties in Malaysia
Defunct political parties in Myanmar
Defunct political parties in Thailand
Defunct political parties in Vietnam
Defunct socialist parties in Singapore
History of the Chinese Communist Party
History of the Communist Party of Vietnam
National liberation movements
Political parties disestablished in 1930
Political parties established in 1925
Socialist parties in Thailand
Transnational political parties